Ryan Patrick Nolan (born 17 February 1999) is an Irish professional footballer who plays as a defender for Raith Rovers.

Club career
Born in County Clare, Republic of Ireland, Nolan was raised in Torre-Pacheco, Spain from a young age - due to this, Nolan is also eligible to play for the Spain National Football Team despite having played for Republic of Ireland youth teams. 

Whilst playing for Torre Pacheco youth team, Nolan was noticed by former player Pierluigi Casiraghi and subsequently recommended to Internazionale. Signing a youth contract, Nolan went on to Captain Inter’s Primavera youth team and, gaining the trust of then-coach Luciano Spalletti, was named on the substitutes bench for various first-team games. 

On 2 September 2019, Nolan left Internazionale and signed with Arezzo. On 31 January 2020, Nolan joined Serie C club Giana Erminio on loan. In the midst of the Coronavirus pandemic, Nolan's contract with Arezzo was terminated by mutual consent on 24 September 2020. He subsequently returned to Spain to join Getafe. Nolan was due to make his first team debut in December 2020 but was ruled out for the season after he tore his cruciate ligament in training.

In February 2022 he signed for Northampton Town.

In August 2022 he signed with Raith Rovers, taking the number 5 shirt.

Nolan made his league debut for Raith Rovers on July 30th 2022, playing the full 90 minutes in an away game against Cove Rangers.

International career
Nolan has represented The Republic of Ireland national team at underage level. He's also eligible to represent  Spain as he moved to the country when he was 8 years old.

References

1999 births
Living people
People from County Clare
Republic of Ireland expatriate association footballers
Republic of Ireland youth international footballers
Republic of Ireland association footballers
Association football defenders
Inter Milan players
S.S. Arezzo players
A.S. Giana Erminio players
Getafe CF B players
Getafe CF footballers
Northampton Town F.C. players
Serie C players
Segunda División B players
Irish expatriate sportspeople in Spain
Irish expatriate sportspeople in Italy
Expatriate footballers in Spain
Expatriate footballers in Italy